Svanemølle Power Station (Danish: Svanemølleværket) is a natural gas fueled combined heat and power station  located at the south side of Svanemølle Bay in the Nordhavnen of Copenhagen, Denmark. Its primary task is to supply district heating to the district-heating network of Greater Copenhagen.

History

Svanemølle Power Station was built by Københavns Belysningsvæsen between 1947 and 1953 to supplement H. C. Ørsted Power Station in the Kongens Enghave. It was designed by Louis Hygom who had already carried out expansions and adaptions of the H. C. Ørsted plant in 1924 and 1932.

The plant was originally coal-fired but was converted to natural gas and oil firing in 1985. In 1995 two old generators were replaced by a gas turbine referred to as unit 7.

Architecture
 
Svanemølle Power Station is built in reinforced concrete and dressed in red brick. Its constellation of boxes and cubic volumes is inspired by American highrise and factory architecture of the 1930s.

See also

 List of power stations in Denmark
 List of power stations

References

External links

 Svanemølleværket, DONG Energy

Energy infrastructure completed in 1953
Energy infrastructure completed in 1995
Power stations in Copenhagen
Coal-fired power stations in Denmark
Natural gas-fired power stations in Denmark
Cogeneration power stations in Denmark
1920 establishments in Denmark